Entmemacornis pulla is a species of snout moth. It was described by Carl Heinrich in 1956. It is found in Brazil.

References

Moths described in 1956
Phycitinae